The world record progression 500 m speed skating men as recognised by the International Skating Union:

The world record of 38.9 seconds was set by Hasse Börjes on 18 January 1970 had been manually timed and thus with a precision of only one tenth of a second. In those days, it was not yet required that a performance be automatically timed (with a precision of one hundredth of a second) in order for it to be recognised as a world record. When Valery Muratov skated 38.99 six days later, it was automatically timed and since – when disregarding the hundredths of a second – the result was the same as the time set by Börjes, it was recognised as a world record. Muratov's world record stood for only one day, because Börjes skated 38.87 the following day. Muratov skated a new world record of 38.73 four days after that.

References
 Historical World Records. International Skating Union.
 

World 00500 men